Saleyevka is a rural locality in Glebovsky Selsoviet Rural Settlement, Fatezhsky District, Kursk Oblast, Russia. The population as of 2010 is 111.

Geography 
The village is located on the Usozha River (a left tributary of the Svapa in the basin of the Seym), 114 km from the Russia–Ukraine border, 41 km north-west of Kursk, 10 km east of the district center – the town Fatezh, 1 km from the selsoviet center – Zykovka.

Climate
Saleyevka has a warm-summer humid continental climate (Dfb in the Köppen climate classification).

Transport 
Saleyevka is located 10 km from the federal route  Crimea Highway as part of the European route E105, 19 km from the road of regional importance  (Kursk – Ponyri), 7 km from the road  (Fatezh – 38K-018), on the road of intermunicipal significance  (M2 "Crimea Highway" – Zykovka – Maloye Annenkovo – 38K-039), 19.5 km from the nearest railway halt 487 km (railway line Oryol – Kursk).

The rural locality is situated 41 km from Kursk Vostochny Airport, 164 km from Belgorod International Airport and 222 km from Voronezh Peter the Great Airport.

References

Notes

Sources

Rural localities in Fatezhsky District